Group 1
 28.09.1989 Reykjavík	       Iceland 	0-2 Sweden
 11.10.1989 BorlÄnge	       Sweden 	5-3 Iceland
 
 1. SWEDEN 		2  2 0 0  7- 3  4 
 2. Iceland 		2  0 0 2  3- 7  0

 Group 2
 26.09.1989 Lappeenranta	Finland 1-3 Denmark
 24.10.1989 Silkeborg	        Denmark 1-1 Finland
 
 1. DENMARK 		2  1 1 0  4- 2  3 
 2. Finland 		2  0 1 1  2- 4  1

 Group 3
 21.11.1989 Rhyl		Wales 		2-3 Northern Ireland
 06.03.1990 Belfast	        North. Ireland 	1-1 Wales

 1. NORTHERN IRELAND	2  1 1 0  4- 3  3 
 2. Wales 		2  0 1 1  3- 4  1

 Group 4
 13.12.1989 Luxembourg 	Luxembourg 	1-5 West Germany
 04.04.1990 Saarbrücken	West Germany 	3-0 Luxembourg
 
 1. WEST GERMANY 	2  2 0 0  8- 1  4 
 2. Luxembourg 		2  0 0 2  1- 8  0

 Group 5
 02.12.1989 Schaan	Liechtenstein 	0-3 Spain
 28.02.1990 Alcala	Spain 		7-0 Liechtenstein   [Alcálá de Henares]
 
 1. SPAIN 		2  2 0 0 10- 0  4 
 2. Liechtenstein 	2  0 0 2  0-10  0

 Group 6
 25.10.1989 Slany 	Czechoslovakia 	9-0 Malta
 04.04.1990 Ta' Qali 	Malta 		0-5 Czechoslovakia
 
 1. CZECHOSLOVAKIA 	2  2 0 0 14- 0  4 
 2. Malta 		2  0 0 2  0-14  0

 Group 7
 08.11.1989 Istanbul	Turkey 		0-1 Austria
 04.04.1990 Hartberg	Austria 	1-2 Turkey

 1. TURKEY 		2  1 0 1  2- 2  2 [away goal]
 2. Austria 		2  1 0 1  2- 2  2

 Group 8
 07.03.1990 Aradippou	Cyprus 2-1 Greece
 04.04.1990 Larnia	Greece 1-2 Cyprus

 1. CYPRUS 		2  2 0 0  4- 2  4 
 2. Greece 		2  0 0 2  2- 4  0

 Group 9
 08.11.1989 Ilawa	Poland 		1-2 Netherlands
 22.11.1989 Middelburg	Netherlands 	0-4 Poland
 06.12.1989 Ostia	Italy 		1-1 Poland
 28.02.1990 Katwijk	Netherlands 	1-0 Italy
 14.03.1990 Warszawa	Poland 		1-0 Italy
 04.04.1990 Molfetta	Italy 		6-1 Netherlands

 1. POLAND 		4  2 1 1  7- 3  5 
 2. Netherlands 	4  2 0 2  4-11  4 
 3. Italy 		4  1 1 2  7- 4  3

 Group 10
 22.10.1989 Kiustendil	Bulgaria 	0-3 Hungary
 04.04.1990 Budapest	Hungary 	3-0 Bulgaria
 
 1. HUNGARY 		2  2 0 0  6- 0  4 
 2. Bulgaria 		2  0 0 2  0- 6  0

 Group 11
 06.12.1989 Annemasse	France 		2-0 Switzerland
 28.03.1990 Sion	Switzerland 	1-0 France

1. FRANCE		2  1 0 1  2- 1  2 
2. Switzerland 	        2  1 0 1  1- 2  2

 Group 12
 07.03.1990 Seravalle 	San Marino 0-3 Portugal
 28.03.1990 Esposendo	Portugal 4-0 San Marino

 1. PORTUGAL 		2  2 0 0  7- 0  4 
 2. San Marino 		2  0 0 2  0- 7  0 
 
 
 Group 13
 22.09.1989 Oslo	Norway 		1-1 Romania
 04.10.1989 Bryne	Norway 		2-0 Scotland
 27.10.1989 Buzau	Romania 	3-1 Norway
 07.11.1989 Braila	Romania 	2-2 Scotland
 14.11.1989 Dunfermline	Scotland 	2-0 Norway
 27.03.1990 Kilmarnock 	Scotland 	1-0 Romania

 1. SCOTLAND 		4  2 1 1  5- 4  5 
 2. Romania 		4  1 2 1  6- 5  4 
 3. Norway 		4  1 1 2  4- 6  3

 Group 14
 22.11.1989 Diegem	Belgium 	2-1 Rep.of Ireland
 04.04.1990 Dublin	Rep.of Ireland 	0-0 Belgium

1. BELGIUM		2 1 1 0 2 1 3 
2. Rep.of Ireland 	2 0 1 1 1 2 1

 Group 15
 23.03.1990 Pancevo	Yugoslavia 	2-0 Soviet Union
 07.04.1990 Kishinev	Soviet Union 	1-0 Yugoslavia

 1. YUGOSLAVIA 		2  1 0 1  2- 1  2 
 2. Soviet Union 	2  1 0 1  1- 2  2

UEFA European Under-17 Championship qualification